Interlaken West is a railway station in the resort town of Interlaken, in the Swiss canton of Bern. It is on the Thunersee line of the BLS AG, and is one of two stations in the town, the other being Interlaken Ost. In addition to trains operated directly by the BLS, the station is also reached by passenger trains of the Swiss Federal Railways and Deutsche Bahn.

The lines through the station are standard gauge and are electrified at 15 kV AC. There are two tracks, narrowing to a single track at either end of the station, and each track is served by a side platform. The station building is situated on the eastern platform.

The station also provides an interchange with the local bus network provided by PostBus Switzerland and the regional bus line to Thun provided by Verkehrsbetriebe STI.

History 
Originally known simply as Interlaken, Interlaken West was the first station to be opened in the town, when the Bödelibahn railway reached it from Därligen, on Lake Thun in 1872. Two years later the railway was extended to Bönigen, on Lake Brienz, via Interlaken Zollhaus station.

Over time, Zollhaus station became the more important station, being also served by the Brünig railway and the Bernese Oberland railway. As a result, Interlaken station was renamed Interlaken West, and Interlaken Zollhaus was renamed Interlaken Ost.

Services 
 the following services stop at Interlaken West; all eastbound/southbound trains terminate in Interlaken Ost:

 EuroCity / InterCity / Intercity Express (ICE): hourly or better service to Basel SBB. Most northbound trains terminate in Basel; a single EuroCity and an ICE continue to Hamburg-Altona and one ICE continues to Berlin Ostbahnhof.
 RegioExpress: four trains per day to Zweisimmen.

References

External links 
 
 

BLS railway stations
Railway stations in the canton of Bern
Swiss Federal Railways stations
Transport in Interlaken